Phillip Carter III (born 1959) is a Senior Foreign Service American diplomat and was United States Ambassador to Ivory Coast from 2010 to 2013. Ambassador Carter holds the diplomatic rank of Minister Counselor. As of November, 2013 he is Deputy to the Commander for Civil Military Engagements, United States Africa Command (AFRICOM) in Stuttgart, Germany.

Diplomatic service
Prior to his appointment as U.S. Ambassador to the Republic of Ivory Coast, Phillip Carter served as a Senior Advisor to the Africa Bureau and previously as Principal Deputy Assistant Secretary from 2008 to 2010.  He also was as the Africa Bureau’s Acting Assistant Secretary during the transition between the Bush and Obama Administrations.  From 2007 to 2008, Phillip Carter was the U.S. Ambassador to the Republic of Guinea. Ambassador Carter has also served as the Director for West African Affairs and the Deputy Director in the Office for East African Affairs at the U.S. State Department.

Prior to that assignment, he was the Deputy Chief of Mission (DCM) at the U.S. Embassy in Antananarivo, Madagascar and DCM in Libreville Gabon. Before his arrival in Gabon in 1997, he was an international financial economist in the State Department's Office of Monetary Affairs in the Bureau of Economic and Business Affairs. During this period, he dealt with international debt and capital matters and served as the Department's point-person on International Monetary Fund issues with Africa.  From 1992-1994, he served as the Economic and Commercial Counselor at the U.S. Embassy in Dhaka, Bangladesh.

Education
Ambassador Carter received a Bachelor of Arts degree in economics and history from Drew University in 1980, and a Master of Arts Degree in International and Development Economics from Yale University in 1995.

References

1959 births
Living people
Ambassadors of the United States to Ivory Coast
Ambassadors of the United States to Guinea
United States Foreign Service personnel
21st-century American diplomats